Chima Centus Nweze (born 25 September 1958) is a Nigerian jurist and Justice of the Supreme Court of Nigeria. He graduated with an LLB (Hons) from the University of Nigeria, Nsukka in 1983, BL from the Nigerian Law School in 1984, MSc in Law 1995, and a PhD in Law 2001 from the University of Nigeria, Nsukka

Law career
Justice chima hails from Enugu State, eastern Nigeria.
Prior to his appointment as justice of the Supreme Court of Nigeria, he was a Justice of the Nigerian courts of appeal.
He was sworn in on October 29, 2014 by Justice Aloma Mariam Mukhtar, the former Chief Justice of Nigeria.

References

Nigerian jurists
Living people
1958 births
People from Enugu State
Supreme Court of Nigeria justices